This is an alphabetical list of poker topics.

0–9 
 2 Months 2 Million
 888 Holdings

A 
 A. J. Benza
 Abe Mosseri
 Absolute Poker
 Aggression (poker)
 Alan Goehring
 Alex Brenes
 Alexandre Gomes
 Ali Eslami
 Ali Nejad
 Alma McClelland
 Almira Skripchenko
 Amnon Filippi
 Anders Henriksson (poker player)
 André Akkari
 Andre Boyer (poker player)
 Andreas Høivold
 Andy Black (poker player)
 Andy Frankenberger
 Annette Obrestad
 Annie Duke
 Anthony Reategui
 Antonio Esfandiari
 Artie Cobb
 Artworx
 Asian Poker Tour

B 
 Bad beat
 Baller Magazine
 Barbara Enright
 Barbara Freer
 Barny Boatman
 Barry Greenstein
 Barry Tompkins
 Berry Johnston
 Bertrand Grospellier
 Betfair
 Beth Shak
 Betsson
 Betting (poker)
 Betting in poker
 BetUS
 Big bet
 Big Deal: A Year as a Professional Poker Player
 Big Game (poker)
 Bigger Deal: A Year Inside the Poker Boom
 Bill Edler
 Bill Smith (poker player)
 Billy Argyros
 Billy Baxter (poker player)
 Blair Hinkle
 Blank expression
 Blind (poker)
 Blind man's bluff (poker)
 Blondie Forbes
 Bluff (poker)
 Bluff Magazine
 Bob Stupak
 Bobby Baldwin
 Boss Media
 Bounty (poker)
 Bourré
 Brandon Cantu
 Brent Musburger
 Bruno Fitoussi
 Bug (poker)
 Burn card
 Button (poker)
 Buying in (poker)
 Bwin.party digital entertainment
 Byron Wolford

C 
 Cake Network
 Calling station
 Card game
 Card Player
 Card room
 Cardroom
 CardRunners
 Cards speak
 Caribbean Stud Poker
 Carlos Mortensen
 Carmen Media
 Carolyn Gardner
 Carter Phillips
 Cash game
 Casino
 Casino game
 Casino hold 'em
 Casino token
 Caspar Berry
 Celebrity Poker Club
 Celebrity Poker Showdown
 Centrebet
 Cereus Poker Network
 Chad Brown (poker player)
 Cheating in poker
 Check-raise
 Chicago (poker card game)
 Chinese poker
 Chip race
 Chip Reese
 Chopping the blinds
 Chris Bell (poker player)
 Chris Karagulleyan
 Chris Rose
 Christer Johansson (poker player)
 Clonie Gowen
 Closed (poker)
 Cold deck
 Colette Doherty
 Colin Murray
 Community card poker
 Corky McCorquodale
 Counterfeit (poker)
 Courtney Friel
 Crown Australian Celebrity Poker Challenge
 Crown Australian Poker Championship
 CryptoLogic
 Curt Gowdy
 Cyndy Violette

D 
 Dag Mikkelsen
 Dan Harrington
 Dan Kelly (poker player)
 Daniel Alaei
 Daniel Negreanu
 Danny Nguyen
 Dario Alioto
 Darus Suharto
 Dave Foley
 Dave Ulliott
 Dave Welch
 David Baxter (poker player)
 David Benyamine
 David Chiu (poker player)
 David Pomroy
 David Rheem
 David Sklansky
 David Williams (card player)
 Davidi Kitai
 Dead money (poker)
 Dealer's choice
 Deby Callihan
 Declaration (poker)
 Dee Luong
 DeucesCracked
 Dewey Tomko
 Dick Van Patten
 Diego Cordovez
 Dogs Playing Poker
 Dominant Factor Test
 Domination (poker)
 Don Williams (poker player)
 Donna Ward
 Douglas Kim
 Doyle Brunson
 Doyles Room
 Draw (poker)
 Draw poker
 Duplicate poker

E 
 E! Hollywood Hold'em
 Eddy Scharf
 Eli Balas
 Eli Elezra
 Epic Poker League
 Eric Baldwin
 Eric Brenes
 Erick Lindgren
 Erik Friberg (poker player)
 Erik Seidel
 Erin Ness
 Eugene Katchalov
 European Poker Tour
 Evelyn Ng
 EverestPoker.com

F 
 Face the Ace
 Fish (poker)
 Five-card draw
 Five-card stud
 Fold equity
 Food Poker
 Four card poker
 Four flush
 Fred Goldberg
 Freddy Deeb
 Freeroll (poker)
 Full House Poker
 Full Tilt Online Poker Series
 Full Tilt Poker
 Full Tilt Poker Championship at Red Rock
 Fundamental theorem of poker

G 
 Gabe Kaplan
 Gabriela Hill
 Gala Coral Group
 Game
 Gary Berland
 Gary Jones (poker player)
 Gavin Griffin
 Gavin Smith (poker player)
 Gene Fisher
 Glen Chorny
 Glenn Cozen
 Glossary of poker terms
 Grant Hinkle
 Greg Raymer
 Gus Hansen
 Guts (card game)
 Gutshot Poker Club

H 
 Hal Fowler
 Hand-for-hand
 Hand history
 Hans Lund
 Harrington on Hold 'em
 Heads Up with Richard Herring
 Heartland Poker Tour
 Henry Green (poker player)
 Hero Poker
 High-low split
 High card by suit (poker)
 High Stakes on the Vegas Strip: Poker Edition
 High Stakes Poker
 History of poker
 Hole cam
 HORSE (poker)
 HOSE
 Howard Andrew
 Howard David
 Howard Lederer
 Hoyt Corkins
 Hung Doan

I 
 Ian Frazer (poker player)
 Independent Chip Model
 Intercontinental Poker Championship
 International Federation of Poker
 International Poker Rules
 IRC poker
 Irish poker
 Irish Poker Open
 Irish Winter Festival of Poker
 Isabelle Mercier
 Isolation (poker)

J 
 J. C. Pearson (poker player)
 J. C. Tran
 J. J. Liu
 J.P. Kelly
 Jack Keller (poker player)
 Jackie McDaniels
 Jake Cody
 James Dempsey (poker player)
 James Hartigan
 James Richburg
 Jan Boubli
 Jason DeWitt
 Jason Lester
 Jason Mercier
 Jay Heimowitz
 Jeff Williams (poker player)
 Jennifer Harman
 Jennifer Leigh
 Jennifer Tilly
 Jerry Van Dyke
 Jesse May
 Jim Doman
 Jimmy Fricke
 Jimmy Snyder
 Joe Bartholdi Jr
 Joe Hachem
 Joe Pelton
 Joe Sebok
 John Ahlers
 John Bonetti
 John Cernuto
 John Duthie
 John Esposito (poker player)
 John Gale (poker player)
 John Guth
 John Hennigan (poker player)
 John Holmes Jenkins
 John Phan
 John Racener
 John Shipley (poker player)
 John Spadavecchia
 Johnny Chan
 Johnny Moss
 Joker Poker
 Jon Friedberg
 Jonathan Duhamel
 Jonathan Little
 Joseph Tehan
 Juha Helppi
 Julian Thew
 June Field

K 
 Kara Scott
 Karen Wolfson
 Karina Jett
 Kathy Liebert
 Katja Thater
 Kelly Kim
 Ken Lennaárd
 Kenna James
 Keven Stammen
 Kevin Nealon
 Kevin Pollak
 Kevin Saul
 Kicker (poker)
 Kill game (poker)
 King of Vegas
 Kristian Kjøndal
 Kristy Gazes
 Kuhn poker

L 
 Ladbrokes
 Lakewood Louie
 Latin American Poker Tour
 Latin American Poker Tour season 1 results
 Latin American Poker Tour season 2 results
 Latin American Poker Tour season 3 results
 Latin American Poker Tour season 4 results
 Layla Kayleigh
 Layne Flack
 Learn from the Pros
 Lee Markholt
 Lee Salem
 Leeann Tweeden
 Leisure and Gaming
 Let It Ride (card game)
 Liar's poker
 Linda Johnson
 Lisa Hamilton
 List of largest poker tournaments in history (by prize pool)
 List of playing-card nicknames
 List of Poker Hand Nicknames
 List of poker hands
 List of poker variants
 Little Man Popwell
 Liv Boeree
 Liz Lieu
 Lon McEachern
 Loretta Huber
 Louis Asmo
 Luca Pagano
 Lucky (American TV series)
 Lucy Rokach
 Luis Velador
 Lyle Berman

M 
 M-ratio
 Made hand
 Mads Andersen
 Malcolm Harwood
 Mansour Matloubi
 Maria Ho
 Maria Stern (poker player)
 Marie Gabert
 Mark Banin
 Mark Seif
 Mark Teltscher
 Marsha Waggoner
 Martin de Knijff
 Martin Wendt
 Mary Jones Meyer
 Mason Malmuth
 Matt Corboy
 Matt Graham (poker player)
 Matt Hawrilenko
 Matt Matros
 Matt Savage (poker)
 Matt Vasgersian
 Matthew Glantz
 Max Stern (poker player)
 Maxim Lykov
 Mayfair Club
 Mechanic's grip
 Mel Judah
 Melanie Weisner
 Melissa Hayden (poker player)
 Mendy Commanda
 Michael Banducci
 Michael DeMichele
 Michael Gracz
 Michael Graves (poker player)
 Michael Greco (actor)
 Michael Keiner
 Michael Konik
 Michael Martin (poker player)
 Michael McDonald (poker player)
 Michael Mizrachi
 Mickey Appleman
 Microgame (company)
 Microgaming
 Mike Cappelletti
 Mike Hart (poker player)
 Mike Matusow
 Mike Sexton
 Mike Watson (poker player)
 Million Dollar Challenge (poker)
 Mimi Rogers
 Mimi Tran
 Mind sport
 Minh Ly
 Moneymaker Effect
 Monica Reeves
 Monte Carlo Millions
 Morton's theorem
 Murph Harrold

N 
 Nam Le (poker player)
 Nani Dollison
 National Heads-Up Poker Championship
 Negative freeroll
 Nenad Medić
 Nic Szeremeta
 Nick Schulman
 Noah Boeken
 Noli Francisco
 Non-standard poker hand
 Norm Macdonald
 Norman Chad
 Norman Pace
 North American Poker Tour
 North American Poker Tour season 1
 North American Poker Tour season 2
 November Nine

O 
 Omaha hold'em
 Omaha hold 'em
 One player to a hand
 Online poker
 Open-ended (poker)
 Open Directory Project
 Out (poker)
 Outline of poker
 Overlay (poker)

P 
 Paddy Power
 Padraig Parkinson
 Pai gow poker
 Partouche Poker Tour
 PartyPoker.com Football & Poker Legends Cup
 Pascal Perrault
 Pat Poels
 Patrick Bruel
 Patrik Antonius
 Paul Darden
 Paul Khoury
 Paul McKinney
 Paul Phillips (poker player)
 Perry Friedman
 Peter Feldman
 Peter Jepsen
 Péter Traply
 Phil Gordon
 Phil Hellmuth
 Phil Ivey
 Phil Laak
 Phyllis Kessler
 Pinnacle Sports
 PKR.com
 Planet Poker
 Playing card
 Playtech
 Poker
 Poker After Dark
 Poker boom
 Poker calculator
 Poker chip
 Poker dealer
 Poker dice
 Poker Dome Challenge
 Poker equipment
 Poker Face Paul
 Poker hand
 Poker jargon
 Poker Million
 Poker Nations Cup
 Poker Night at the Inventory
 Poker Night Live
 Poker on television
 Poker Player
 Poker probability
 Poker psychology
 Poker Royale
 Poker run
 Poker Smash
 Poker strategy
 Poker table
 Poker tools
 Poker Tour Finnkampen
 Poker tournament
 Poker2Nite
 PokerStars
 PokerStars Big Game
 PokerStars Caribbean Adventure
 PokerStove
 Pokertek
 PokerTH
 PokerTracker
 Pokerzone
 Position (poker)
 Positively Fifth Street
 Post-oak bluff
 Pot (poker)
 Pot odds
 Prahlad Friedman
 Pro-Am Poker Equalizer
 Professional Poker Tour
 Protection (poker)
 Puggy Pearson
 Pyramid poker

Q 
 Q-ratio

R 
 Rake (poker)
 Ram Vaswani
 Rank of hands (poker)
 Red dog poker
 Red Hodges
 Red Hot Poker Tour
 Red Winn
 Richard Herring
 Rob Hollink
 Robert Cheung
 Robert Thompson (poker director)
 Robert Turner (poker player)
 Robert Williamson III
 Roberto Romanello
 Rod Peate
 Roland De Wolfe
 Rolf Slotboom
 Roll your own (poker)
 Rollout (poker)
 Ron Rose
 Rose Pifer
 Roy Brindley
 Roy Winston (poker player)
 Rupert Elder
 Russian Poker
 Ruth Godfrey (poker player)
 Ryan Daut

S 
 Sabina Gadecki
 Sally Boyer
 Sam Angel
 Sam Mastrogiannis
 Sam Trickett
 Sarge Ferris
 Satellite tournament
 Scott Clements
 Scott Fischman
 Scott Seiver
 Scotty Nguyen
 Sebastian Ruthenberg
 Seven-card stud
 Seven twenty-seven
 Sexy Poker
 Shana Hiatt
 Shandi Finnessey
 Shannon Elizabeth
 Shawn Buchanan
 Shirley Rosario
 Short-stacked
 Showdown (poker)
 Sid Wyman
 Simon Trumper
 Sky Betting and Gaming
 Slow play (poker)
 Southern District of New York action against online poker players
 Spanish poker
 Speed poker
 Split (poker)
 Sport
 Sportingbet
 Stacked with Daniel Negreanu
 Stan James
 Stanley Weiss
 Starla Brodie
 Steal (poker)
 Steve Brecher
 Steve Paul-Ambrose
 Straight flush
 Strip poker
 Strip Poker (game show)
 Stripped deck
 Stu Ungar
 Stuart Fox
 Stud poker
 Suited connectors
 Super Bowl of Poker
 Super/System
 Susie Isaacs
 Sverre Krogh Sundbø
 Svetlana Gromenkova

T 
 T. J. Cloutier
 Table stakes
 Tatjana Pašalić
 Taylor von Kriegenbergh
 Ted Forrest
 Tell (poker)
 Terry King
 Texas Hold'em Bonus Poker
 Texas Hold'em Tournament
 Texas hold 'em
 Texas Hold 'em (video game)
 Texas Hold 'Em Poker (video game)
 Texas HoldEm Poker (Zynga game)
 Texas Shootout
 Thang Luu
 The Biggest Game in Town
 The Gaming Club World Poker Championship
 The Poker Channel
 The Poker Player's Championship
 The Poker Star
 The Professor, the Banker, and the Suicide King
 The United States Poker Championship
 Theo Jørgensen
 Thomas Bihl
 Thor Hansen
 Three card brag
 Three card poker
 Tiffany Michelle
 Tiffany Williamson
 Tilt (poker)
 Tilt (TV series)
 Tom Abdo
 Tom Marchese
 Tom McEvoy
 Tony Cascarino
 Tony Cousineau
 Tony G
 Tony Kendall (poker player)
 Tournament director (poker)
 Tuan Le
 Twist (poker)

U 
 UK and Ireland Poker Tour
 UK and Ireland Poker Tour season 1 results
 UK and Ireland Poker Tour season 2 results
 Ultimate Poker Challenge
 UltimateBet
 Underground poker
 Unibet
 United States v. Scheinberg
 Unlawful Internet Gambling Enforcement Act of 2006

V 
 Value (poker)
 Vanessa Rousso
 Vanessa Selbst
 Vegas Stakes
 Victor Chandler Poker Cup
 Victor Ramdin
 Victoria Coren
 Vincent Van Patten
 Vivek Rajkumar

W 
 Wendeen H. Eolis
 Wild card (card games)
 William Hill (bookmaker)
 William Thorson
 World Championship of Online Poker
 World Championship Poker
 World Cup of Poker
 World Heads-Up Poker Championship
 World Poker Tour
 World Poker Tour season 10 results
 World Series of Poker
 World Series of Poker (video game)
 World Series of Poker 2008: Battle for the Bracelets
 World Series of Poker: Pro Challenge
 World Series of Poker: Tournament of Champions
 World Sports Exchange
 World Tavern Poker Tour

Y 
 Yahoo! Directory
 Yevgeniy Timoshenko
 Yoshio Nakano